Wyoming Highway 318 (WYO 318) is a short east-west  spur route off Wyoming Highway 270 in northeastern Platte County.

Route description
Wyoming Highway 318 begins at Wyoming Highway 270 in the small Town of Hartville. WYO 318 travels east as Hartville's Main Street for a mile till it reaches the old mining town of Sunrise at 1.09 miles. Upon reaching the former town, WYO 318 ends at a road closed sign as the mine property is gated. The Sunrise Mine operated until 1980 and produced 42,457,187 tons of iron ore

History 
The section of present-day Wyoming Highway 270 from US 26 at Guernsey north to Hartville at present-day Wyoming Highway 318 was formerly designated as Wyoming Highway 318 prior to the 1970s. Highway 318 used to begin as US 26 at Guernsey and end at Sunrise with a 90 degree turn at Hartville. The stretch between Guernsey and Hartville was recommissioned as Wyoming Highway 270 when that road was completed between Manville and Hartville to maintain continuity.

Major intersections

References

External links 

Wyoming State Routes 300-399
WYO 318 - WYO 270 to Sunrise
Hartville, WY website
Sunrise, WY history

Transportation in Platte County, Wyoming
318